Pichne is a village and municipality in Snina District in the Prešov Region of north-eastern Slovakia.

History
In historical records the village was first mentioned in 1312.

Geography
The municipality lies at an altitude of 290 metres and covers an area of 16.925 km². According to the 2013 census it had a population of 567 inhabitants.

References

External links
 
 Geographic.org

Villages and municipalities in Snina District